Fred Chang (Chinese: 張法俊, born 1956/57) is a Taiwanese-born American entrepreneur. He is the founder of Newegg, an online computer hardware and software store. He debuted on the Forbes' 2014 global list of billionaires and holds the position of #1940 in its 2017 ranking.

Early life
Chang has a degree from the Chinese Cultural University.

Newegg
Before Newegg, Chang owned ABS Computers, a mail order company selling high-end PCs and gaming systems based in Whittier, California. Building on this experience, he founded Newegg in 2001. It has grown into a multibillion-dollar company, becoming the second-largest online-only retailer in the United States.

In August 2008, it was announced that Chang would step down as the CEO and chairman of Newegg while still being a member of Board of Directors and Executive Committee. He also retained his position as the President of Newegg's China operations. He was succeeded by Tally Liu. In 2010, upon the departure of Liu, Chang took up his old role as CEO of the company. In 2019, Anthony Chow became CEO of Newegg.

References

1950s births
American billionaires
American computer businesspeople
American technology chief executives
American technology company founders
Taiwanese emigrants to the United States
Year of birth missing (living people)
Living people